Burritos, Inspiration Point, Fork Balloon Sports, Cards in the Spokes, Automatic Biographies, Kites, Kung Fu, Trophies, Banana Peels We've Slipped On and Egg Shells We've Tippy Toed Over is Cap'n Jazz's only full-length studio album, released in 1995 on Man With Gun Records.  It is also referred to as the Shmap'n Shmazz LP.   For a long period of time, the record in its original form was completely out of print—only recently has it been reissued on Polyvinyl Records on cassette tape and digitally. There was also a reissue of the vinyl LP licensed by Tiny Superhero records in the UK.

The twelve tracks found on this album are also found on Analphabetapolothology – a double CD containing all of Cap'n Jazz's recorded material – released in 1998 by Jade Tree Records.

Reception
NME listed the album as one of "20 Emo Albums That Have Resolutely Stood The Test of Time". In Rolling Stones list of the 40 greatest emo albums of all time, the album came in 7th, with Suzy Exposito writing that the album was "a significant blueprint for dozens of emo and post-hardcore acts to follow." "Little League" appeared on a best-of emo songs list by Vulture.

Track listing
All tracks written by Cap'n Jazz, except where noted.
 "Little League" – 3:57
 "Oh Messy Life" – 2:03
 "Puddle Splashers" – 2:07
 "Flashpoint: Catheter" – 3:21
 "In the Clear" – 1:57
 "Yes, I Am Talking to You" (Cap'n Jazz, Bob Nanna) – 2:32
 "Basil's Kite" – 2:36
 "Bluegrassish" – 1:08
 "Planet Shhh" – 2:59
 "The Sands Have Turned Purple" – 2:45
 "Precious" (Cap'n Jazz, Ryan Rapsys) – 2:39
 "¡Qué suerte!" (Cap'n Jazz, Kevin J. Frank) – 3:04

Personnel
 Cap'n Jazz
 Tim Kinsella – lead vocals
 Davey von Bohlen – guitars, backing vocals
 Victor Villareal – guitars
 Sam Zurick – bass
 Mike Kinsella – drums

Additional personnel
 Anja Westerweck – backing vocals (on track 1)
 Casey Rice – tambourine (on tracks 1, 3), recording, mixing
 Kevin J. Frank – piano (on track 8)

References

Cap'n Jazz albums
1995 debut albums
Emo albums by American artists
Art punk albums
Post-hardcore albums by American artists